Raphaële Billetdoux (born 28 February 1951 in Paris) is a French novelist.

Biography
She is the daughter of François Billetdoux, and was a companion of the political journalist Paul Guilbert (died July 2002).

She was assistant editor on feature films and television.  Then in 1975, she became a journalist.
She made a feature film, La Femme enfant (1980). In 2006, she wrote a memoir, Un peu de désir, sinon je meurs, under the name "Marie" Billetdoux.

Awards
 Bourse de la Fondation del Duca, for Jeune fille en silence.
1974 Prix Louise de Vilmorin and Prix Contrepoint, for L'Ouverture des bras de l'homme
1976 Prix Interallié, for Prends garde à la douceur des choses
1985 Prix Renaudot, for Mes nuits sont plus belles que vos jours

Works
Jeune fille en silence, Éditions du Seuil, Paris, 1971; Seuil, 2007, 
L'Ouverture des bras de l'homme, Éditions du Seuil, Paris, 1973; Seuil, 2006, 
Prends garde à la douceur des choses, Éditions du Seuil, 
Lettre d'excuse, Éditions du Seuil, Paris, 1981, 
Mes nuits sont plus belles que vos jours, Grasset, Paris, 1985, 
Night without day, Viking, 1987, 
Entrez et fermez la porte, Grasset, Paris, 1991, 
Mélanie dans un vent terrible, Grasset, Paris, 1994, 
Chère madame ma fille cadette, Grasset, Paris, 1997, 
Je frémis en le racontant: horresco referens, Plon, Paris, 2000, 
De l'air, Albin Michel, Paris, 2001, 
Un peu de désir sinon je meurs, Albin Michel, Paris, 2006, 
C'est fou, une fille..., Albin Michel, Paris, 2007, 
C'est encore moi qui vous écris, Stock, Paris, 2010,

References

External links

1951 births
Living people
French women novelists
Prix Renaudot winners
Prix Interallié winners
French memoirists
20th-century French novelists
21st-century French novelists
French women memoirists
Officers of the Ordre national du Mérite
Commandeurs of the Ordre des Arts et des Lettres
Chevaliers of the Légion d'honneur
Writers from Paris
21st-century French women writers
20th-century French women writers
21st-century memoirists